Taylor Dumpson (born ) is an American attorney and 2021 President's Fellow at the Lawyers' Committee for Civil Rights Under Law. She was targeted for hate crimes after she became the first Black woman president of the student government at American University, and responded to an online troll storm with a successful lawsuit.

Biography
Dumpson was born in Washington D.C. and raised in the Eastern Shore of Maryland. Her mother is an executive vice president at the University of Maryland Eastern Shore and her father is an executive movie producer. Her family ties to the Eastern Shore begin in the 1800s. She has described the killing of Trayvon Martin as a life-changing event and a "generational moment" that inspired her to become more involved in activism during high school. She attended Wicomico High School, then American University for her BA in Law and Society, and completed her JD at Benjamin N. Cardozo School of Law.

At American University, she was a member of the predominantly Black sorority Alpha Kappa Alpha, and began her term as the first Black woman president of the student government on April 30, 2017. On May 1, bananas hung from nooses, some including notes directed at her sorority, were found on campus, and the FBI began to investigate. Students protested and hundreds attended a town hall meeting in response to the incident.

Within days, Dumpson was told by the Anti-Defamation League that the neo-Nazi website The Daily Stormer run by Andrew Anglin had targeted her for a "troll storm" of cyberharassment, including by posting her picture and social media contact information. She has said she increased security precautions and experienced PTSD as a result of the harassment that followed.

In April 2018, with representation from the Lawyers' Committee for Civil Rights Under Law, Dumpson filed a lawsuit alleging violations of the District of Columbia Human Rights Act of 1977 and the D.C. Bias-Related Crimes Act of 1989 against Andrew Anglin, Evan James McCarty, and Brian Andrew Ade. The lawsuit also included a variety of allegations against Anglin, including incitement of intentional infliction of emotional distress, interfering with her right to equal opportunity to education, and conspiracy to commit stalking. In December 2018, Dumpson reached a settlement with McCarty that was influenced by principles of restorative justice and included his agreement to apologize to Dumpson, to renounce white supremacy, and to complete community service.

In August 2019, in a default judgment, Dumpson was awarded more than $725,000 in damages, costs, and fees against Anglin, as well as restraining orders against Anglin, Ade, and Moonbase Holdings, known as the company that supports The Daily Stormer. In her ruling, Judge Rosemary M. Collyer found Dumpson was "targeted because of her race and gender", and Dumpson's attorney Kristen Clarke described the ruling as "historic" due to the finding that racist online trolling can cause interference with equal access to a public accommodation.

Dumpson is a 2021 President's Fellow at the Lawyers' Committee for Civil Rights Under Law, a DC-based organization that promotes civil rights.

References

External links
 Dumpson v. Ade, Memorandum Opinion, August 9, 2019 (Case 1:18-cv-01011-RMC, United States District Court for the District of Columbia)
 TED talk

21st-century African-American women
21st-century African-American people
Activists for African-American civil rights
American University alumni
Living people
Year of birth missing (living people)
Benjamin N. Cardozo School of Law alumni
African-American lawyers